The Central Karoo District Municipality (Afrikaans: Sentraal Karoo-distriksmunisipaliteit) is a district municipality located in the Western Cape Province of South Africa. Its municipality code is DC5.

Geography
The Central Karoo District Municipality is divided into three local municipalities, which are described in the following table.

Adjacent municipalities
Pixley ka Seme District Municipality, Northern Cape (northeast)
Sarah Baartman District Municipality, Eastern Cape (east)
Garden Route District Municipality (south)
Cape Winelands District Municipality (southwest)
Namakwa District Municipality, Northern Cape (northwest)

Demographics
The following statistics are from the 2011 Census. Note that due to fuzzing applied to statistics, columns may not sum to exactly the indicated total.

Politics

The council of the Central Karoo District Municipality consists of thirteen councillors. Six councillors are directly elected by party-list proportional representation, and seven are appointed by the councils of the local municipalities in the district: five by Beaufort West and one each by Laingsburg and Prince Albert.

 there are six councillors from the Democratic Alliance (DA), four from the African National Congress (ANC), two from the Karoo Gemeenskap Party (KGP) and one from the Karoo Democratic Force (KDF). The DA, KGP and KDF are in a coalition which governs the council. The following table shows the detailed composition of the council.

The following table shows the results of the election of the six directly elected councillors.

References

External links 
 
 Western Cape Government site
 Tourism site

District municipalities of the Western Cape
Central Karoo District Municipality
Karoo